Vika and Linda is the debut studio album by Australia vocal duo Vika & Linda Bull. The album was released in May 1994 and debuted and peaked at number 7 on the Australian ARIA Charts in June 1994.

At the ARIA Music Awards of 1995, the album was nominated for ARIA Award for Breakthrough Artist – Album, but lost to Frogstomp by Silverchair.

Critical reception
Ed St John from Rolling Stone Australia wrote: "It's the simplest of ideas: take two of Australia's best singers, find them a bunch of great original songs, and then put them in the studio with a sympathetic producer and the best band you can muster. Not surprisingly, the results here are frequently exceptional. Beautifully played - with an accent on subtle arrangements and largely acoustic instruments - the album is imbued with a warm inner glow and a genuine musical depth. Perhaps because of the contributions of such a broad diversity of writers - and thanks also to the fact that Vika and Linda Bull possess strikingly different voices - the album moves effortlessly across a spectrum of styles but, for the most part, is a very laid-back, often country-flavoured affair. Still, far from getting bogged down in a single groove, Vika and Linda is a real feast.

It's not the kind of album where singles, or "standout tracks", are easy to pick. Sure, the first single "When Will You Fall For Me" has a terrific rousing chorus. Three of the Paul Kelly songs are killers, including the slow reggae of "We've Started A Fire" and the funky "I Know Where to Go to Feel Good". Also intriguing is "Ninety Nine Years", a song Kelly wrote with the Bull sisters. Utilising eastern tones and a haunting melody, it marks an interesting and very appealing departure for all three artists."

Track listing
 "Hard Love" (Paul Kelly) – 4:40
 "When Will You Fall for Me" (Mark Seymour) – 3:47
 "House of Love" (Wayne Burt) – 4:12
 "Gone Again" (Nick Barker) – 3:16
 "We've Started a Fire" (Paul Kelly) – 5:06
 "I Didn't Know Love Could Be Mine" (Paul Kelly) – 3:23
 "Sacred Things" (Joe Camilleri) – 3:31
 "Love This Time" (Wayne Burt) – 3:36
 "Ninety Nine Years" (Paul Kelly, Vika and Linda) – 3:56
 "I Know Where to Go to Feel Good" (Paul Kelly) – 5:03
 "These Hands" (Eris O'Brien) – 4:28
 "The Blue Hour" (Chris Abrahams, Stephen Cummings) – 4:55

1995 bonus disc
 "Set on Freedom" – 4:26
 "Up Above My Head (I Hear Music in the Air)" – 2:32
 "Have a Little Faith in Me" – 4:01
 "Saved" – 3:20
 "Many Rivers to Cross" – 5:03

Personnel
 Jex Saarelaht – electric piano, organ
 Jeff Burstin – guitar
 Justin Stanford – shaker
 Paul Kelly – vocals, guitar

Charts

Weekly charts

Year-end charts

Certifications

References

1994 debut albums
Vika and Linda albums
Mushroom Records albums